José Antonio Fajardo (October 18, 1919 – December 11, 2001)  was a Cuban charanga bandleader and flautist, who played the traditional five-keyed wooden flute.

Born in Pinar del Río, Cuba, Fajardo after performing with the band of Antonio María Romeu, formed his own charanga band in 1949.

Fajardo died in December 2001, at the age of 82.

References

1919 births
2001 deaths
Cuban bandleaders
Cuban flautists
Cuban composers
Male composers
Mambo musicians
Cha-cha-cha musicians
Danzón musicians
People from Pinar del Río
Cuban charanga musicians
Cuban male musicians
20th-century flautists